Parahypopta is a genus of moths in the family Cossidae.

Species
 Parahypopta caestrum Hübner, 1804
 Parahypopta nigrosignata (Rothschild, 1912)
 Parahypopta radoti (Homberg, 1911)

Former species
 Parahypopta issycus Gaede, 1933
 Parahypopta putridus Christoph, 1887
 Parahypopta sheljuzhkoi (Zukowsky, 1936)

References

Natural History Museum Lepidoptera generic names catalog

Cossinae